The 2004 Fareham Council election took place on 10 June 2004 to elect members of Fareham Borough Council in Hampshire, England. Half of the council was up for election, with the Conservative Party increasing their majority.

After the election, the composition of the council was:
Conservative 22
Liberal Democrat 9

Campaign
Before the election there were 18 Conservative and 12 Liberal Democrat councillors, with 15 of the 31 seats being contested. One of the 15 seats, in Fareham South ward, was vacant after an independent, former Liberal Democrat, councillor had stepped down, after being fined for false housing and council tax benefit claims. Fareham South was among a number of wards which were reported as being vulnerable to a change in party control including Fareham East, Fareham North, Portchester West, Stubbington and Titchfield Common. A couple of former councillors who had been defeated in the 2002 election stood again, former Labour group leader Mick Prior in Fareham North-West and Conservative Nick Walker in Portchester West.

Issues in the election included council tax levels and plans by the government to build 1,000 houses near Sarisbury. The national issue of the Iraq War was also seen as being likely to sway votes in the election.

Election result
The results saw the Conservatives increase their majority on the council after gaining 3 seats from the Liberal Democrats. Conservative gains included Stubbington where they won by only 8 votes over the Liberal Democrats after a recount and in Portchester West where Nick Walker returned to the council. The Conservatives also gained a seat in Fareham South from an independent in a seat which had previously been seen as strongly Liberal Democrat. The Liberal Democrats partly blamed their defeats on the election being held at the same time as the European elections, while a defeated Labour candidate said their failure to win any seats was in line with the national performance by the party.

Overall turnout increased to 40.3% with a rise in postal votes to 6,000 contributing to the increase.

Ward results

Fareham East

Fareham North

Fareham North West

Fareham South

Fareham West

Hill Head

Locks Heath

Park Gate

Portchester East

Portchester West

Sarisbury

Stubbington

Titchfield

Titchfield Common

Warsash

References

2004
2004 English local elections
2000s in Hampshire